Tony Braxton may refer to:
 Toni Braxton (born 1967) female American R&B musician
 Anthony Braxton (born 1945) male American free jazz musician